Jämtland is a large land-locked Swedish province in the heart of the Scandinavian peninsula in northern Europe. Jämtland covers an area of 34,009 square kilometres, 8.3 per cent of Sweden's total area and is the second largest province in Sweden.

Jämtland stretches 315 kilometers in a north-south direction and 250 kilometers in an east-west direction and is equal in size to Ireland. Jämtland's western border is characterised by kölen (fell) which stretch throughout the province from north to south with branches into the region's southeastern parts. The massif is broken at some places by large valleys stretching to the Norwegian Sea. These valleys have been used for centuries as paths connecting Jämtland to the west. The valleys were particularly trafficked during pilgrimages to Nidaros, the 4th most visited pilgrimage site during the medieval period. No fewer than three pilgrim roads traversed Jämtland.

Elevation extremes

The entire province is more or less a highland region with the highest peak being Storsylen, a peak in the Sylan mountain range with an elevation of 1,728 meters. This is not the highest peak in the mountain range, as that peak is on the other side of the border. Another large peak in Jämtland Åreskutan (1,420 meters). The lowest point in the province is as low as 35 meters above sea level and is in the eastern part of Jämtland.

Geology
When the last ice age ended 10,000 BC and when the ice crept back, huge quantities of dirt, stones and boulders were left behind. The material deposited directly by the glacier is referred to as till and is by far the most common compound in Jämtland's soil. As the ice sheet was shrinking, a large ice lake was created in Jämtland, the so-called Central Jamtish Ice Lake. It covered most of what is now Jämtland and bordered the remains of the ice sheet in the east and the Scandinavian Mountains in the west. After a couple of millennia (approximately 7 300 BC), the eastern barrier collapsed and all the melted water broke through and found its way to the Bothnic Sea. Storsjön, "the great lake," is a remnant of this large ice lake. Gerard De Geer considered this event as the year zero in his geological time scale since he saw it as the definite ending of the last ice age.

Streams

Approximately eight percent of Jämtland's area is covered by water and the province has two larger streams, Ljungan and Indalsälven (sometimes referred to as Jämtlandsälven). Both emanate from the Scandinavian Mountains and drain several lakes on their way eastwards to lower elevations. 

The water surfaces are in most cases 300 meters above sea level. In the northernmost parts of Jämtland, the fells are roughly 900–1,100 meters high. In these parts important tributaries to the Angerman River emanate from each side of the Blåsjö Fells. One of them originates on the fell's east side and drains lakes like Storjoudan and Storsjouten (443 meters above sea level) and later on Flåsjön (265 m) after which it disappears into Ångermanland. The other originates on the western part of the mountain range and drains lakes such as Blåsjön (both the small and the large one, 443 m), both Stor- and Lill-Jorm, Kvarnbergsvattnet (331 m) and afterwards the water system Ströms Vattudal (286 m), then it continues its journey and drains Fångsjön as Faxälven.

The largest stream, Jämtlandsälven, has numerous important tributaries throughout the province. From northern Jämtland several small streams are united as Ammerån. Hårkan is another tributary which flows south of Ammerån. Hårkan begins on the Norwegian side of the border in Nord-Trøndelag and drains Hotagen (310 m) and the lakes further south before it reaches Lit and pours out in Jämtlandsälven.   

From Offerdal- and Sösjöfjällen emanates the tributary Långan, a small stream which drains lake Landösjön (331 m). Jämtlandsälven itself starts in Jämtland's westernmost mountain range and drains lakes such as Torrön  (411 m), Juvuln and Kallsjön (386 m) and Liten (318) before it reaches Storsjön.
The lakes Anjan (420 m) and Stora Rensjön are drained by Kallsjön and in Lake Liten the tributary Enan is emptied. Enan runs from the Sylan mountain range and has a tributary of its own in Handölan, a small stream which also runs from the Sylan mountain range (though it has another point of origin) and empties in Ånnsjön (528 m). Afterwards Enan is joined by Åreälven, a stream falling from large heights which has resulted in waterfalls such as Tännforsen, the outlet of lake Tännsjön. From Härjångsfjällen runs Vålån which is emptied in Ottsjön, which together with Håckren is emptied through, e.g., Ristafallet in Lake Liten. All the conjoined streams then run toward Ockesjön where streams from Ovikenfjällen also are emptied, before they all reach Storsjön (292 m), Jämtland's largest and Sweden's fifth largest lake. Several tributaries empty in Storsjön such as the one near Ytterån where Näldssjön and Alsensjön are emptied. Lake Näkten (324 m) terminates in southern Storsjön. Storsjön itself is emptied in Krokom where the Indalsälven continues its journey throughout Jämtland. The  tributaries Långan, Hårkan, and Ammerån are afterwards united with Jämtlandsälven on its course eastwards to Medelpad and the Bothnian sea. 
Next to Storsjön's easternmost tip, the Gulf of Brunflo, lies Locknesjön (the locked lake, 327 m). Locknesjön is emptied to Bodsjön (307 m) and then to Revsundssjön (288 m), which is drained by Gimån, one of Ljungan's tributaries. Ljungan's source comes from the fells near the Jamtish-Herdalian border.  Ljungan runs through lakes such as Börtnessjön and Rätanssjön in southern Jämtland.

Climate

Jämtland has a temperate climate and belongs to the temperate zone's northernmost area. The climate in Jämtland is both humid continental and subarctic, depending on the location. The climate is greatly affected by the Norwegian Sea and the Atlantic Ocean, due to several mountain passes in Scandinavian mountain range.

In western Jämtland mild winters with abundant precipitation are common. This is because of the warm winds brought to the area by the Gulf Stream. The average precipitation in the Jamtish Fells is roughly 1,000 millimetres per year, with Skäckerfjällen as extreme with about 1,500 mm. The precipitation rates in the middle of the province are more moderate. In fact the central and eastern parts of Jämtland have meager precipitation. In Storsjöbygden the annual averages is as low as 500 mm. Due to the warm winds the temperature during the winters reaches its maximum in the fell region at about -7-8 °C in Storlien and environs. The coldest winter temperatures, roughly -11°C, are found in the province's outskirts like Börtnan. Maximum temperatures in the summer months average from 14°C in Jämtland's eastern parts to around 11°C in the fell region. On some mountain peaks the averages are usually as low as 5°C.

The highest (34.0°C) and lowest (-45.8°C) temperatures ever recorded in Jämtland were in its easternmost parts near Hammarstrand in 1947 and 1950.

Blizzards are common in Jämtland, and especially in the fell region. The most notable blizzard is the one that arose on New Year's Eve 1718. The heaviest winds in Jämtland may gust to 55 metres/s.

Towns

There's only one chartered city in Jämtland, Östersund, founded 1786. Jämtland is a sparsely populated region, more so than Sweden and Scandinavia as a whole. There are only 3.3 persons per square kilometer and the population is unevenly distributed. In Jämtland County (including the province of Härjedalen) 34 per cent of the total population live outside an urban area, making Jämtland one of the most rural regions in Scandinavia. Most people in Jämtland live in Storsjöbygden, the area around Storsjön in larger towns such as the Östersund with Frösön, Krokom, Ås, Nälden, and Jämtland's second largest town Brunflo. The largest urban areas outside Storsjöbygden are municipal seats Strömsund, Järpen, Bräcke, and Hammarstrand, along with towns such as Åre, Hammerdal, and Lit.

See also
Geography of Sweden
Provinces of Sweden

Jämtland
Geography of Sweden